Bashaud Breeland (born January 30, 1992) is an American football cornerback who is a free agent. He played college football at Clemson, and was drafted by the Washington Redskins in the fourth round of the 2014 NFL Draft. He also played for the Green Bay Packers, Minnesota Vikings, and Kansas City Chiefs, having won Super Bowl LIV with the latter.

Early years
Breeland attended Allendale-Fairfax High School in Fairfax, South Carolina, where he played football and basketball and ran track. In football, he played quarterback and defensive back. He was an All-state selection by The State and All-Atlantic Region team member by PrepStar. As a junior, he had 95 rushes for 789 yards with 12 touchdowns on offense, and totalled 76 tackles on defense. He led the Tigers to a 10–2 record as a senior after rushing for 1,270 yards and 15 touchdowns. He was also a starter on the basketball team.

In track & field, Breeland won the state title in the 400m hurdles as a sophomore and junior, and helped his team reach the state title in track as a junior. He captured two state titles at the 2010 SCHSL State Championships, winning the 110m hurdles (15.06s) and the 400m hurdles (54.78s). He earned a tenth-place finish in the 300m hurdles at the 2010 Bob Hayes Invitational at 40.69 seconds. He was also timed at 4.41 in the 40-yard dash and posted a 280-pound bench press and 450-pound squat.

Recruiting
Regarded as a three-star recruit by Rivals.com, Breeland was regarded as the No. 22 safety in the nation and No. 6 player in South Carolina by Scout.com, and the No. 56 safety in the nation by ESPN.com. He chose Clemson over Penn State, South Carolina, Tennessee, and Virginia Tech.

College career
Breeland attended Clemson University from 2010 to 2013. He finished his career with 136 tackles, three sacks and six interceptions. He entered the 2014 NFL Draft after his junior season.

Professional career

Washington Redskins
The Washington Redskins selected Breeland in the fourth round with the 102nd overall pick of the 2014 NFL Draft. He was the tenth cornerback drafted in 2014.

2014 season
On May 16, 2014, the Washington Redskins signed Breeland to a four-year, $2.70 million contract that includes a signing bonus of $486,000. Throughout training camp, Breeland competed for a roster spot as a backup cornerback against Tracy Porter, E. J. Biggers, Chase Minnifield, and Richard Crawford. Head coach Jay Gruden named Breeland the fifth cornerback on the depth chart to start the regular season, behind DeAngelo Hall, David Amerson, E. J. Biggers, and Tracy Porter.

He made his professional regular debut and first career start in the Washington Redskins’ season-opener at the Houston Texans and made one solo tackle in the 17–6 loss. Breeland started the game at strong safety after Brandon Meriweather was suspended for the first two games of the season. On September 25, 2014, Breeland started at cornerback after DeAngelo Hall sustained a ruptured Achilles the previous game and was subsequently placed on injured-reserve. He made two solo tackles as the Redskins lost 45–14 against the New York Giants in Week 4. On October 17, 2014, Breeland recorded five solo tackles, a pass deflection, and made his first career interception during a 19–17 victory against the Tennessee Titans. Breeland intercepted a pass by quarterback Charlie Whitehurst, that was originally intended for tight end Delanie Walker, during the second quarter. He had a breakout performance in the Week 8 win against the Dallas Cowboys. He covered starting wide receiver Dez Bryant, limiting him to only three receptions, forced DeMarco Murray to fumble which was recovered by safety Brandon Meriweather, and broke up a pass on fourth down sealing the Redskins' overtime victory. In the Week 16 game against the Philadelphia Eagles, he intercepted quarterback Mark Sanchez late in the fourth quarter to help seal the Redskins victory.

On December 31, 2014, the Washington Redskins announced their decision to mutually part ways with defensive coordinator Jim Haslett. Breeland completed his rookie season with 66 combined tackles (57 solo), 14 pass deflections, two forced fumbles, and two interceptions in 16 games and 15 starts.

2015 season
Breeland entered training camp slated as a starting cornerback and competed against DeAngelo Hall to retain the role. On July 31, 2015, the NFL suspended Breeland for the first game of the 2015 NFL season after he was cited by Virginia Commonwealth University police for possession of marijuana on August 11, 2014. On exactly the same day, Breeland was injured during the second day of training camp during practice and was carted off the field. It was later announced that he sprained his MCL and was expected to recover in four to six weeks and would not be able to participate for the rest of training camp.

In Week 5, he recorded his first interception of the season against Atlanta Falcons quarterback Matt Ryan. In Week 6, Breeland had a solid performance against the New York Jets, having recorded one interception, one forced fumble, and two fumble recoveries.

2016 season

Despite having a difficult time covering wide receiver Antonio Brown in the Week 1 loss to the Pittsburgh Steelers, Breeland recorded his first interception of the season against Ben Roethlisberger. In the Week 16 win, he recorded two interceptions on Chicago Bears quarterback Matt Barkley, which made him the first Redskins player since Fred Smoot in 2001 to start his career recording multiple interceptions in three consecutive seasons.

2017 season
Breeland recorded the first interception of the 2017 season against quarterback Kellen Clemens in the Week 14 game against the Los Angeles Chargers, which he returned for 96 yards for a touchdown.

Following the season, Breeland became an unrestricted free agent. On March 16, 2018, Breeland agreed terms with the Carolina Panthers on a three-year, $24 million contract, including $11 million in guaranteed money. However, he failed his physical after a cut on his foot from a visit to the Dominican Republic became infected; the contract was therefore voided and he became a free agent again.

Green Bay Packers

2018 season
On September 25, 2018, the Green Bay Packers signed Breeland to a one-year, $880,000 contract that includes a signing bonus of $90,000. The Packers signed Breeland after Davon House sustained a shoulder injury and was subsequently placed on injured-reserve. Head coach Mike McCarthy named Breeland the fifth cornerback on the depth chart, behind Tramon Williams, Kevin King, Josh Jackson, and Jaire Alexander.

Breeland's first game as a Packer was a 17–31 loss to the New England Patriots in Week 9, after missing several weeks to learn the playbook. In Week 10, against the Miami Dolphins, Breeland recorded his first interception of the season off Brock Osweiler. He injured his groin in Week 11 against the Seattle Seahawks and missed the next two games. Breeland returned in the Week 14 game against the Atlanta Falcons, where he recorded a 22-yard interception return touchdown off Falcons quarterback Matt Ryan, while also having a fumble recovery in the same game that helped seal a 34–20 win for the Packers.

Kansas City Chiefs

2019 season
On March 18, 2019, the Kansas City Chiefs signed Breeland to a one-year, $2-million contract that includes a signing bonus of $1.15 million. Head coach Andy Reid named Breeland a starting cornerback to begin the regular season, alongside Kendall Fuller.

In Week 2 against the Oakland Raiders, Breeland intercepted Derek Carr in the endzone as the Chiefs won 28–10. In Week 4 against the Detroit Lions, Breeland recovered a fumble by running back Kerryon Johnson in the endzone and returned it 100 yards for a touchdown in the 34–30 win. Additionally, in Week 14, Breeland made the game-winning pass deflection against the New England Patriots on fourth down in a defining victory, while seizing control of the AFC West. In Super Bowl LIV against the San Francisco 49ers, Breeland recorded a team-high seven tackles and intercepted a pass by Jimmy Garoppolo during the 31–20 win.

2020 season
On April 14, 2020, the Kansas City Chiefs signed Breeland to a one-year, $3 million contract that includes a signing bonus of $1.50 million. He was suspended the first four games of the 2020 season for violating the league's policy on substance abuse, and was placed on the reserve/suspended list on September 5, 2020. He was reinstated from suspension on October 6 and activated to the roster on October 10. Overall, he finished the 2020 season with 38 total tackles, two interceptions, nine passes defended, and one forced fumble.

Minnesota Vikings
Breeland signed with the Minnesota Vikings on June 8, 2021. He entered the 2021 season as a starting cornerback alongside Patrick Peterson. In Week 14, Breeland had eight tackles and intercepted Ben Roethlisberger in a 36–28 win over the Pittsburgh Steelers. On December 18, 2021, Breeland was waived by the Vikings after getting into a verbal altercation with coaches and teammates at practice on the same day.

Arizona Cardinals
On January 4, 2022, Breeland was signed to the Arizona Cardinals practice squad.  His contract expired when the team's season ended on January 17, 2022.

NFL career statistics

Personal life
Breeland was arrested on April 28, 2020, for multiple charges, including resisting arrest, having alcohol in a motor vehicle with the seal broken, having an open container of beer or wine in a motor vehicle, possession of 28 grams or less of marijuana or 10 grams of hash, and driving without a license. The police officer who detained Breeland alleged that Breeland threw a “large blunt” into his car and he pushed the deputy out of the way and attempted to flee the officer before he was detained. Police found marijuana in the car as well as open bottles of beer and tequila. The morning after the arrest, he posted to his Twitter that the marijuana was thrown into his car, but quickly deleted the tweets. The arresting officer said that Breeland informed him that he was a “marijuana enthusiast”. Breeland was already facing a suspension for a failed drug test prior to the arrest. He pleaded guilty on October 2, 2020, and received a 30-day suspended jail sentence and $100 fine for each charge.

References

External links
Kansas City Chiefs bio
Clemson Tigers bio

1992 births
Living people
People from Allendale, South Carolina
Players of American football from South Carolina
American football cornerbacks
Clemson Tigers football players
Washington Redskins players
Green Bay Packers players
Kansas City Chiefs players
Minnesota Vikings players
Arizona Cardinals players